Horenbout or Hornebolt is a surname. Notable people with the surname include:

Gerard Horenbout (1465–1541), Flemish miniaturist
Lucas Horenbout (1490/1495–1544), Flemish artist
Susannah Horenbout (1503–1554), English artist